This is a list of golf courses in Portugal.

Algarve

West Algarve

Álamos Golf
Alto Golf
Amendoeira Golf Resort
Faldo Course
O'Connor Jnr. Course
Boavista Golf
Espiche Golf
Morgado Golf
Palmares Golf
Alvor (9 holes)
Praia (9 holes)
Lagos (9 holes)
Parque da Floresta
Penina Golf and Resort
Championship Course
Resort Course (9 holes)
Gramacho
Silves Golf
Vale da Pinta
Vale de Milho

Central Algarve

Balaia Golf Village
Pine Cliffs Golf
Pinheiros Altos
Pinheiros (Pines, 9 holes)
Sobreiros (Corks, 9 holes)
Oliveiras (Olives, 9 holes)
Quinta do Lago
North Course
South Course
Laranjal Course
Salgados Golf
San Lorenzo Golf
Vale do Lobo
Ocean Course
Royal Course
Vila Sol
Prime (9 holes)
Challenge (9 holes)
Prestige (9 holes)
Vilamoura
Laguna Golf Course
Millennium Golf Course
Vilamoura Old Course
Pinhal Golf Course
Victoria Golf Course

East Algarve

Benamor Golf
Castro Marim Golfe
Atlântico (9 holes)
Guadiana (9 holes)
Grouse (9 holes)
Monte Rei Golf Club
Quinta da Ria
Quinta de Cima
Quinta do Vale

Lisbon

Aroeira Golf Resort
Aroeira I
Aroeira II
Belas Clube de Campo
Bom Sucesso Golf
Campo Real Lisboa
Golfe do Estoril
Golden Eagle Golf
Golfe do Vimeiro
Lisbon Sports Club
Marvão Golf
Golfe do Montado
Oitavos Dunes
Praia d'El Rey
Paço do Lumiar
Penha Longa Golf Resort
Atlântico Championship
Atlântico Norte (Championship front 9 plus old Mosteiro 9)
Atlântico Sul (Championship back 9 plus old Mosteiro 9)
Quinta da Beloura
Quinta da Marinha
Quinta do Perú
Ribagolfe
Ribagolfe I
Ribagolfe II
Royal Obidos Spa and Golf Resort
Santo Estevão
Tróia Golf Resort

Porto

Club Golf Miramar
Curia Golf Club
Estela Golf Club
Golfe de Amarante
Montebelo Golfe
Oporto Golf Club
Ponte de Lima Golf
Quinta da Barca
Quinta do Fojo
Vidago Palace Golf

Azores
Batalha Golf Club
Furnas Golf Course
Golfe da Ilha Terceira (Terceira Island Golf Course )

Madeira

Golfe Santo da Serra (Hosted the Madeira Island Open from 1993 to 2008 and 2012 to 2015 )
Machico (9 holes)
Desertas (9 holes)
Serras (9 holes)
Palheiro Golfe
Porto Santo Golfe (Hosts the Madeira Island Open from 2009 to 2011 )

References

External links

 Relevant Portuguese Golf Travel website
 Overview of all golf courses in Portugal with reviews

 
Porugal
Golf